Sergi Altimira Clavell (born 25 August 2001) is a Spanish footballer who plays as a midfielder for CE Sabadell FC.

Club career

Sabadell
Born in Cardedeu, Barcelona, Catalonia, Altimira joined FC Barcelona's La Masia in 2012, from hometown club FC Cardedeu. In 2019, he left Barça and joined CE Sabadell FC.

Loan to Granollers
On 29 May 2020, after finishing his formation, Altimira was loaned to Tercera División side EC Granollers for the season. He made his senior debut on 1 November, coming on as a second-half substitute in a 7–0 away routing of UE Figueres.

Breakthrough
Upon returning to Sabadell, Altimira was included in the first team squad by manager Antonio Hidalgo, and renewed his contract with the club on 7 September 2021. He played 29 times for the side in all competitions during the 2021–22 campaign.

Altimira's performances has led to interest in his services from his former club Barcelona, amongst others. Strong interest was reported to be present from the Gerard Piqué's FC Andorra, as well as from La Liga side Villareal CF. However, despite Barcelona's efforts to sign Altimira on the final day of the transfer window in August 2022, they were unable to agree terms on the transfer leaving Altimira remaining under contract to Sabadell until June 2023.

Getafe
On 31 February 2023, Marca reported that Altimira had an agreement to join top tier club Getafe CF on a four-year contract upon the conclusion of his contract with Sabadell.

Personal life
Altimira's father Aureli and his cousin Adrià are also footballers. The former played as a forward, while the latter is a defender; both were also groomed at Barça.

References

External links
 
 
 

2001 births
Living people
People from Vallès Oriental
Spanish footballers
Footballers from Catalonia
Association football midfielders
Primera Federación players
Tercera División players
CE Sabadell FC footballers
EC Granollers players